De Schepper is a surname. Notable people with the surname include:

Cornelis de Schepper (born 1503?-1555), Flemish counsellor and ambassador for the Holy Roman Emperor Charles V, Ferdinand I of Austria and Mary of Hungary, governor of the Netherlands
Els de Schepper (born 1965), Flemish actress, comedian and writer
Kenny de Schepper (born 1987), French tennis player
Robert de Schepper (1885 – ?), Belgian Olympic fencer

See also
Scheppers